Cubadamsiella is a genus of land snails with an operculum, terrestrial gastropod mollusks in the family Pomatiidae.

Species 
Species within the genus Cubadamsiella include:
Cubadamsiella beneitoi Fernández-Garcés, Espinosa & Ortea, 2003
Cubadamsiella gratiosa (Torre & Bartsch, 1941)
Cubadamsiella lamellata (Alcalde, 1945)
Cubadamsiella lamellata Alcalde, 1945
Cubadamsiella leoni (Torre & Bartsch, 1941)
Cubadamsiella procax (Poey, 1851)

References 

Pomatiidae